John Francis Kane (September 24, 1882 in Chicago, Illinois – January 28, 1934 in St. Anthony, Idaho) was a professional baseball player who played outfielder in the Major Leagues from 1907 to 1910. He would play for the Chicago Cubs and Cincinnati Reds.

In 261 games over four seasons, Kane posted a .220 batting average (181-for-824) with 118 runs, 7 home runs, 59 RBIs, 53 stolen bases and 76 bases on balls. Defensively, he finished his career with an overall .952 fielding percentage playing at every position except pitcher, catcher and first base.

Kane died in an automobile accident in St. Anthony, Idaho.

External links

1882 births
1934 deaths
Major League Baseball outfielders
Chicago Cubs players
Cincinnati Reds players
Road incident deaths in Idaho
Minor league baseball managers
Pittsburg Coal Diggers players
Seattle Siwashes players
Vernon Tigers players
Venice Tigers players
Los Angeles Angels (minor league) players
Salt Lake City Bees players
San Francisco Seals (baseball) players
Baseball players from Chicago